Robert Bruce Zoellick (born July 25, 1953) is an American public official and lawyer who was the eleventh president of the World Bank, a position he held from July 1, 2007 to June 30, 2012. He was previously a managing director of Goldman Sachs, United States Deputy Secretary of State (resigning on July 7, 2006) and U.S. Trade Representative, from February 7, 2001 until February 22, 2005. Zoellick has been a senior fellow at Harvard's Belfer Center for Science and International Affairs since ending his term with the World Bank. He is currently a Senior Counselor at Brunswick Group.

A graduate of Swarthmore College and Harvard University, Zoellick served as White House Deputy Chief of Staff under James A. Baker III from 1992 to early 1993.

Background
Robert Bruce Zoellick was born in Naperville, Illinois, the son of Gladys (Lenz) and William T. Zoellick. His ancestors were German and he was raised Lutheran. He graduated in 1971 from Naperville Central High School, graduated Phi Beta Kappa in 1975 from Swarthmore College as an Honors history major and received his J.D. from Harvard Law School magna cum laude and a Master of Public Policy degree from Harvard University's John F. Kennedy School of Government in 1981.

Career

Judicial clerkship (1982–1983)
Upon graduation from Harvard Law School, Zoellick served as a law clerk for Judge Patricia Wald on the United States Court of Appeals for the District of Columbia Circuit.

Government service (1985–1992)
Zoellick served in various positions at the Department of the Treasury from 1985 to 1988.  He held positions including Counselor to Secretary James Baker, Executive Secretary of the Department, and Deputy Assistant Secretary for Financial Institutions Policy.

During George H. W. Bush's presidency, Zoellick served with Baker, by then Secretary of State, as Under Secretary of State for Economic and Agricultural Affairs, as well as Counselor to the Department (Under Secretary rank). Zoellick served as Bush's personal representative or "sherpa" for the G7 Economic Summits in 1991 and 1992. He led the US Delegation to the Two Plus Four talks on German reunification. For his achievements in this role, the Federal Republic of Germany awarded him in 1992 the Knight Commander's Cross of the Order of Merit.

James A. Baker's book "The Politics of Diplomacy" notes that Zoellick was one of Secretary Baker's "inner circle" . . . "combin[ing] Midwest common sense with policy sophistication." He was a "superb manager, policy analyst, and writer," Baker's "second brain" and "gatekeeper" and his "right hand man on NAFTA," the North American Free Trade Agreement. In August 1992, Zoellick was appointed White House Deputy Chief of Staff and Assistant to the President.

Business, academia, and politics (1993–2001)

After leaving government service, Zoellick served from 1993 to 1997 as an Executive Vice President and General Counsel of Fannie Mae.  Afterwards, Zoellick was John M. Olin Professor of National Security at the U.S. Naval Academy (1997–98); Research Scholar at the Belfer Center for Science and International Affairs at the John F. Kennedy School of Government; and Senior International Advisor to Goldman Sachs.

From 1996 to 1999, he served as director of the Aspen Strategy Group. He served as an elected member of the board of the Council on Foreign Relations.

From fall 1998 to May 1999, Zoellick headed the Center for Strategic and International Studies (CSIS). He resigned when founder David Abshire chose not to retire.

In the 2000 presidential election campaign, Zoellick served as a foreign policy advisor to George W. Bush as part of a group, led by Condoleezza Rice, which she termed The Vulcans, after her home town of Birmingham, Alabama. James Baker designated him as his second-in-command—"a sort of chief operating officer or chief of staff"—in the 36-day battle over recounting the vote in Florida.

U.S. Trade Representative (2001–2005)
Zoellick was named U.S. Trade Representative in Bush's first term; he was a member of the Executive Office, with cabinet rank. According to the U.S. Trade Representative website, Zoellick completed negotiations to bring China and Taiwan into the World Trade Organization (WTO); developed a strategy to launch new global trade negotiations at the WTO meeting in Doha, Qatar; shepherded Congressional action on the Jordan Free Trade Agreement and the Vietnam Trade Agreement; and worked with Congress to pass the Trade Act of 2002, which included new Trade Promotion Authority. "Zoellick is indisputably one of the most successful members of the first Bush cabinet."

Some groups claimed he promoted the Central American Free Trade Agreement over the objections of labor, environmental, and human rights groups.

Zoellick played a key role in the U.S.-WTO dispute against the European Union over genetically modified foods. The move sought to require that the European Union comply with international obligations to use science-based methods in continuing its moratorium on the approval of new genetically modified crops within the E.U.

Deputy Secretary of State (2005–2006)
 

On January 7, 2005, Bush nominated Zoellick to be Deputy Secretary of State. Zoellick assumed the office on February 22, 2005.  Zoellick agreed to serve as Deputy Secretary of State for not less than one year.

He was seen as a major architect of the Bush administration's policies regarding China. In an important speech September 21, 2005, Zoellick challenged China "to become a 'responsible stakeholder' in the international system, contributing more actively than in the past to help shore up the stability of the international system from which it ha[d] benefited so greatly." In his "thoughtful and influential speech...Zoellick correctly argued that China had benefited greatly from the security and prosperity created by a stable, rule-based international economic and political order. But China had contributed a disproportionally small amount to maintain that order. Zoellick recognized that one of the great challenges facing diplomats in the United States, Europe, and Japan was to persuade China to do more to contribute to the global commons."

In addition, Zoellick chartered a new direction in the Darfur peace process.  He made four trips to Sudan during his time as Deputy Secretary. He supported expanding a United Nations force in the Darfur region to replace African Union soldiers. He was involved in negotiating a peace accord between the government of Sudan and the Sudan Liberation Army, signed in Abuja, Nigeria, in May 2006. Zoellick was seen by many as the administration's strongest voice on Darfur. His resignation catalyzed groups, such as the Genocide Intervention Network, to praise his record on human rights issues.

President of the World Bank (2007–2012)
On 30 May 2007, President George W. Bush nominated Zoellick to replace Paul Wolfowitz as President of the World Bank.

On 25 June 2007, Zoellick was approved by the World Bank's executive board.

On 1 July 2007, Zoellick officially took office as President of the World Bank.

In a major speech at the National Press Club in Washington on October 10, 2007, Zoellick formulated what he described as "six strategic themes in support of the goal of an inclusive and sustainable globalization" which he proposed should guide the future work of the World Bank:

During Zoellick's time at the World Bank, the institution's capital stock was expanded and lending volumes increased to help member countries deal with the global financial and economic crisis; assistance was stepped up to deal with the famine in the Horn of Africa; a major increase in resources was achieved for the institution's soft loan facility, the International Development Association (IDA), which lends to the poorest countries; and a reform was carried out to the World Bank's shareholding, Executive Board and voting structure, to increase the influence of developing and emerging economies in the World Bank's governance.

In "The Quiet Revolutionary who saved the World Bank", Financial Times commentator Sebastian Mallaby wrote that during his term Zoellick had "driven remarkable change... adapt[ing] nimbly to the new world that globalisation has wreaked." Zoellick made advances in the use of open data, promoted senior officials from developing countries, addressed climate change, expanded aid during the financial crisis and obtained a capital increase, with developing countries providing more than half.

Senior Fellow at Harvard Kennedy School (2012–present)
After leaving the World Bank, Zoellick took up the position as a senior fellow at Harvard Kennedy School's Belfer Center for Science and International Affairs on July 1, 2012. From September 2013 through 2016, he served as Chairman of International Advisors to Goldman Sachs.

Mitt Romney 2012 presidential campaign

During the 2012 United States presidential election, Zoellick was appointed to lead the national security portion of Republican candidate Mitt Romney's transition team should he be elected President of the United States.  Zoellick was considered a "heavyweight with impressive government experience"  who was likely to be part of any Romney administration "economic brain trust."

Anonymous sources supposedly affiliated with Romney's transition project claimed he hoped to be appointed as Romney's United States Secretary of State. This speculation was also fueled by Politico in August 2012, when it was reported that 'in diplomatic circles it is seen as very likely' that Zoellick "could get the top job" as Secretary of State in a potential Romney cabinet. However, other anonymous "former Romney advisers" stated to Foreign Policy that foreign policy transition team members would not necessarily receive certain jobs in Romney's potential administration.  This speculation about Zoellick's possible role in a Romney administration was moot when Romney lost the election to incumbent Barack Obama.

Board memberships and honors
Zoellick has served as a board member for a number of private and public organizations, including Alliance Capital, Said Holdings, Rolls-Royce, the Precursor Group, and Laureate International Universities. Since 2013, he has been a member of the board of directors of the Peterson Institute for International Economics, and since 2018 of the Carnegie Endowment for International Peace. He is an independent director of Robinhood  and a trustee of the Wildlife Conservation Society  He is also a member of Washington D.C. based think tank, The Inter-American Dialogue. He chairs the Global Tiger Initiative and is a member of the Global Leadership Council of Mercy Corps, a global humanitarian agency. He is a member of the Council on Foreign Relations.

Jack Dorsey announced on July 19, 2018 that Zoellick would be a member of Twitter's Board of Directors. As of April 22, 2022, Zoellick had neither posted on Twitter nor liked any other tweet.

Since 2 August 2013, Zoellick has been a board member of Temasek Holdings - Singapore's Sovereign Wealth Fund.

Previously, he was a member of the advisory board of AXA, of Viventures, a venture fund, and a director of the Aspen Institute's Strategy Group. He has also served on the boards of the German Marshall Fund and the European Institute and on the World Wildlife Fund Advisory Council. He was a member of Secretary William Cohen's Defense Policy Board Advisory Committee.

He is a recipient of the Distinguished Service Award, the Department of State's highest honor, the Alexander Hamilton Award of the Department of the Treasury, and the Medal for Distinguished Public Service of the Department of Defense.

In 1992, he received the Knight Commander's Cross of the Order of Merit of the Federal Republic of Germany for his eminent achievements in the course of German reunification.  In 2002, he was awarded an honorary Doctor of Humane Letters from Saint Joseph's College in Rensselaer, Indiana. The Mexican and Chilean governments awarded him their highest honors for non-citizens, the Aztec Eagle and the Order of Merit, for recognition of his work on free trade, development, and the environment.

In 2016, he received the Walter and Leonore Annenberg Excellence in Diplomacy Award.

In 2017, he was a recipient of the Economic Club of Minnesota's Bill Frenzel Champion of Free Trade Award.

Served as non-executive chairman of the board of AllianceBernstein, May 2017-May 2019.

Views
Zoellick signed the January 26, 1998 letter to President Bill Clinton from Project for a New American Century (PNAC) that noted the "inadequacy of relying on Saddam Hussein's cooperation" in refraining from the use of weapons of mass destruction and urged a strategy aimed at the removal of Saddam Hussein's regime from power in Iraq. The letter pressed President Clinton to employ a "full complement of diplomatic, political and military efforts."

In a January 2000 Foreign Affairs essay entitled "Campaign 2000: A Republican Foreign Policy," he noted five Republican principles (respect for power, building and sustaining coalitions and alliances, recognizing common interests with international agreements and institutions, embracing new technologies for global politics and security, and the continuing presence of bad actors.  "[T]here is still evil in the world—people who hate America and the ideas for which it stands. Today, we face enemies who are hard at work to develop nuclear, biological, and chemical weapons, along with the missiles to deliver them. The United States must remain vigilant and have the strength to defeat its enemies. People driven by enmity or by a need to dominate will not respond to reason or goodwill. They will manipulate civilized rules for uncivilized ends." Much of the essay stresses the links between power and economics "The United States needs a strategic economic-negotiating agenda that combines regional agreements with the development of global rules for an open economy." The same essay praises the idealism" of Theodore Roosevelt and Woodrow Wilson.

In Australia's New Left Review, Gavan McCormack claimed that USTR Zoellick intervened during a 2004 privatization issue in Japanese Prime Minister Junichiro Koizumi's re-election campaign.  McCormack wrote, "The office of the U.S. Trade Representative has played an active part in drafting the Japan Post privatization law. An October 2004 letter from Robert Zoellick to Japan's Finance Minister Takenaka Heizo, tabled in the Diet on August 2, 2005, included a handwritten note from Zoellick commending Takenaka. Challenged to explain this apparent U.S. government intervention in a domestic matter, Koizumi merely expressed his satisfaction that Takenaka had been befriended by such an important figure… It is hard to overestimate the scale of the opportunity offered to U.S. and global finance capital by the privatization of the Postal Savings System." 

In the lead-up to the 2010 G-20 Seoul summit and in the immediate wake of the U.S. elections and subsequent Fed QE2 monetary-policy move, Zoellick published a suggestion  for increased awareness of the function of gold in international currency markets.  This was misinterpreted by many economists as a call for the return of some form of gold standard in a post-Bretton Woods II world.  Zoellick's response was to point out the misinterpretation: he did not advocate a return to the gold standard, but a new role for gold in currency markets as an alternative monetary asset, which he termed "reference point gold".

In March 2016, Zoellick signed an "open letter" in which GOP national security leaders outlined their reasons not to support a ticket headed by Donald Trump. In August, Zoellick signed a letter from fifty GOP national security officials calling Trump a national security risk. 

Zoellick was one of three Cabinet-level Republican officials to oppose Trump's candidacy.  In an interview with Deutsche Welle(DW)Nov.1, 2016, Zoellick said "My belief differences with Trump were not only placed on policy -- his protectionism, his infatuation with authoritarian leaders and Vladimir Putin. But also that I think he is a narcissistic, ego-driven person and that he would be dangerous. I have had the good fortune to serve a number of different presidents and I know the importance of that job and I don't want him in the Oval Office."

Zoellick has written extensively on foreign policy and international economics. He is a proponent of free trade. 

In a September 2017 article, he urged Congress to assert its constitutional powers over trade before Trump's policies "unravel vital ties across the Asia-Pacific region, hurt an ally facing a security crisis, destroy a North American partnership ... and subvert confidence in the U.S. around the world." He contributes opinion pieces to the Financial Times, Washington Post and the Wall Street Journal. Zoellick is the author of America in the World.

See also
 Distinguished German-American of the Year
 The Keynesian Resurgence of 2008 / 2009

References

External links

Board of Trustees at Carnegie Endowment 
World Bank biography
State Department biography
Zoellick in Zmag
"China and America: Power and Responsibility" – An address by Zoellick to the Asia Society Annual Dinner in New York, on February 25, 2004
Robert Zoellick's list of federal campaign contributions
Zoellick reports, clippings and sources
Profile of Zoellick in the Harvard Law Record

|-

|-

|-

|-

1953 births
American investment bankers
American Lutherans
American people of German descent
Carnegie Endowment for International Peace
Foreign Policy Research Institute
George W. Bush administration cabinet members
George W. Bush administration personnel
Goldman Sachs people
Harvard Law School alumni
Illinois Republicans
International Republican Institute
Harvard Kennedy School alumni
Knights Commander of the Order of Merit of the Federal Republic of Germany
Living people
Massachusetts Republicans
Members of the Inter-American Dialogue
Members of the Steering Committee of the Bilderberg Group
Peterson Institute for International Economics
Politicians from Naperville, Illinois
Presidents of the World Bank Group
Swarthmore College alumni
United States Deputy Secretaries of State
United States Trade Representatives
White House Deputy Chiefs of Staff